Deathwish, Inc. is an American independent record label conceived by Jacob Bannon of Converge and Tre McCarthy in 2000. Their first release was Deeper the Wound, a split album between Converge and Japanese band Hellchild on April 23, 2001. Deathwish established itself quickly, working with a diverse group of bands and eventually becoming one of the most respected and innovative labels in contemporary hardcore punk and aggressive music in general.

After having previously worked with RED Distribution, in March 2016, Deathwish signed a global deal with Alternative Distribution Alliance (ADA), an independent distribution label under Warner Music Group that has also partnered with other punk labels including Epitaph Records, Rise Records, and Run for Cover Records.

Deathwish, Inc. has also expanded into releasing exclusive archived prints from various artists, which include Jacob Bannon.

Related labels

In 1999, Linas Garsys and Tru Pray founded the hardcore punk independent record label Malfunction Records. Deathwish merged with Malfunction in August 2007, and originally announced that the two labels would still exist as separate entities with Malfunction acting as an imprint label and Deathwish's staff operating both businesses. However, one of Malfunction's last releases was Bitter Ends' 2008 self-titled EP. Deathwish still distributes some of Malfunction's back catalog.

In 2012, Jeremy Bolm of Touché Amoré formed his own imprint label under Deathwish dubbed Secret Voice.

In 2014, Jami Morgan of Code Orange along with Pat Kindlon of Self Defense Family formed their own imprint under Deathwish titled Harm Reduction Records.

The label in the past has operated an imprint label Icarus Records, for more experimental and ambient sounding bands, though it has been dormant for many years and only released albums from two artists.

In 2009, Deathwish expanded into independent music distribution offering exclusive and featured distribution of other record labels. Currently, Deathwish distributes many labels including: Closed Casket Activities, ConCult (Converge self-released titles), Iodine Recordings, Discos Huelga, Grave Mistake Records, Nonbeliever, React! Records, Painkiller Records, Perfect Victim Records, Six Feet Under Records, State of Mind Recordings, and Vitriol Records.

Deathwish Fest
For two nights in July 2014, Deathwish hosted back-to-back concerts in Massachusetts featuring current and formerly signed bands of the label. Both nights featured headliners Converge and Trap Them, the first show had Modern Life is War, Doomriders, Cult Leader, Self Defense  Family and Harm Wülf as openers; while the second night had Young and in the Way, Code Orange, Oathbreaker, New Lows and Chrome Over Brass (Alex Garcia-Rivera of Give Up the Ghost, Bloodhorse) as openers. The label also stated that this is the first of a series of events. In May/June, the Deathwish Fest toured Europe for a 7-day gig featuring Converge, Trap Them, Harm's Way and Young and in the Way.

Former MMA sponsorship
Deathwish began sponsoring several mixed martial arts UFC fighters in 2008. Among the label's sponsored fighters includes: Dan "The Outlaw" Hardy, Joe "J-Lau" Lauzon, Dan "The Upgrade" Lauzon, Toby "Tigerheart" Grear and several local Boston grapplers. Bannon is also a licensed MMA judge, and designed some of the fighters' clothing. Deathwish's sponsorship of MMA declined in the early 2010s and all references to this subject have been removed from its official website.

Label discography

As of January 2015, Deathwish Inc's discography includes over 170 releases from over 90 different bands (including non-Deathwish artists featured on split releases). Its main discography most prominently features 10 releases from Converge, eight from Self Defense Family (End of a Year) and seven from Blacklisted.

In March 2014, Deathwish uploaded its entire catalog onto the music streaming/purchasing service, Bandcamp.

Current artists

 Birds in Row
 Bitter End
 Blacklisted
 Bossk
 Burn
 Chrome Over Brass (Alex Garcia-Rivera)
 Cold Cave
 Cold World
 Converge
 Cult Leader (featuring three members of Gaza)
 Death Index
 Doomriders
 Frail Body
 Frameworks
 Gouge Away
 Greet Death
 HarborLights
 Harm Wülf (George Hirsch of Blacklisted)
 Hesitation Wounds
 The Hope Conspiracy
 Loma Prieta
 Modern Life Is War
 New Lows
 Oathbreaker
 Planes Mistaken for Stars
 Process Black
 Quentin Sauvé (Q. of Birds in Row)
 Shipwreck A.D.
 Starkweather
 Super Unison (featuring Meghan O'Neil from Punch)
 Wear Your Wounds

Former artists

 100 Demons
 108
 AC4
 Acid Tiger
 A Life Once Lost
 American Nightmare/Give Up the Ghost
 The Blinding Light
 Boysetsfire
 Breather Resist
 Burning Love
 Carpathian
 The Carrier
 Ceremony
 Code Orange (formerly Code Orange Kids)
 Coliseum
 Cursed
 Damage
 Deafheaven
 Death of Lovers
 The Dedication
 Embrace Today
 Extreme Noise Terror
 First Blood
 The Great Deceiver
 Harm's Way
 Heiress
 Hellchild
 Holyghost
 Horror Show
 I Hate You
 Integrity
 Irons
 Jacob Bannon
 Jesuseater
 Killing the Dream
 Knives Out
 Life Long Tragedy
 Lies (featuring members of The Hope Conspiracy and Skin Like Iron)
 Living Eyes
 Narrows
 The Power and The Glory
 The Promise
 Pulling Teeth
 Punch
 Razor Crusade
 Reach the Sky
 Ringworm
 Rise and Fall
 Rot In Hell
 So Be It
 Self Defense Family
 Some Girls
 The Suicide File
 Terror
 Touché Amoré
 Trap Them
 United Nations
 Victims
 Whips/Chains
 White Jazz (featuring three members of Rise and Fall)
 Wovenhand
 Young and in the Way

Related labels artists

Malfunction artists (1999–2008)

 American Nightmare
 Barfight
 Cast Aside
 Ceremony
 Four Walls Falling
 Internal Affairs
 Learn
 Meltdown
 Moment of Youth
 Piece by Piece
 Rag Men
 Reign Supreme
 Right On
 Shitfit
 Time Flies
 TouchXDown
 Trash Talk
 Wheelbite
 Worn Thin

Icarus artists (2003–2005)
 Halfacre Gunroom
 Switchblade

Secret Voice artists (2012–present)
 Dangers
 Drug Church
 Hesitation Wounds
 Newmoon
 Single Mothers
 Andrew Thomson
 Warm Thoughts (formally Dad Punchers)

Harm Reduction artists (2014–present)
 Axis
 Drown
 Purge
 Resistance Wire
 Steel Nation
 Detain
 Unit 731
 Threat 2 Society

References

External links

Deathwish Inc. at Bandcamp (also: Deathwish Live Series, Malfunction, Secret Voice and Harm Reduction)

 
Record labels established in 2000
2000 establishments in Massachusetts
Companies based in Beverly, Massachusetts
American independent record labels
Hardcore record labels
Punk record labels
Heavy metal record labels
Doom metal record labels
Grindcore record labels
Post-hardcore record labels